Fadil El Ghoul (born 2 April 1986), performing under the stage name R3hab (stylized in all caps as R3HAB; pronounced "rehab"), is a Dutch-Moroccan disc jockey and music producer.

Ranked at number 12 on the DJ Mag Top 100 DJs in 2018, R3hab has produced two full studio albums and has remixed songs for a wide variety of artists, including 5 Seconds of Summer, Katy Perry, Arashi, Everglow, Lady Gaga, Taylor Swift, Rihanna, Rammstein, Steve Aoki, The Chainsmokers, For King & Country, and KSI.

Career 

R3hab began his career in late 2007 while producing the track "Mrkrstft" which was remixed by fellow Breda DJ Hardwell. His connection with what was then a small scene of Dutch DJs helped him to grow. After releasing Prutataaa with Afrojack, he signed with Afrojack's label, producing and remixing tracks.

Released independently, his debut album Trouble has gained over 500 million streams globally to date. R3hab's second full-length studio album received over 350 million plays, with tracks "Ain't That Why", "Hold On Tight", "The Wave" and "Lullaby" reaching the Billboard Hot Dance/Electronic charts.

R3hab remixed ATC's 2000 single "Around The World (La La La)", which became his most streamed song on Spotify with over 142 million streams and features "A Touch of Class." The track topped the Spotify charts in eight countries and landed on the Global Viral Chart.

In 2019, R3hab joined an artist management company called Dancing Dragon Management under Live Nation Electronic Asia for an exclusive deal to spread in China. In the same year, Liquid State, a joint venture between Tencent and Sony Music, said at the All That Matters conference that it had signed R3hab to an Asian distribution deal. As part of the deal, he will be releasing new tracks through Liquid State that focus on the Asian market, while licensing his CYB3RPVNK label's music library of more than 190 tracks. On his current world tour, R3hab has performed in 116 concerts (as of 26 October 2019) and has featured Cash Cash and Alan Walker.

Discography 

 Trouble (2017)
 The Wave (2018)

DJ Magazine Top 100 DJs

References

External links 

 Official website

1986 births
Living people
Dutch DJs
Dutch house musicians
Dutch record producers
People from Breda
Dutch people of Moroccan descent
Spinnin' Records artists
Dutch electronic musicians
Electronic dance music DJs
Remixers